Bradly John Sinden (born 19 September 1998) is a British Taekwondo athlete who won gold at the 2019 World Taekwondo Championships, becoming the first British male taekwondo champion. At the 2020 Summer Olympics, he reached the final in his weight category where he won a silver medal, losing 34–29 against Ulugbek Rashitov.

He won the silver medal in the men's featherweight event at the 2022 World Taekwondo Championships held in Guadalajara, Mexico.

References 

Living people
1998 births
British male taekwondo practitioners
Sportspeople from Doncaster
European Taekwondo Championships medalists
World Taekwondo Championships medalists
Taekwondo practitioners at the 2020 Summer Olympics
Olympic silver medallists for Great Britain
Medalists at the 2020 Summer Olympics
Olympic taekwondo practitioners of Great Britain
Olympic medalists in taekwondo
21st-century British people